Kurt Brenkendorf (born Benno Kurt Bockenheuser; 13 June 1882 – 10 September 1944) was a German stage and film actor.

Selected filmography
The Mexican (1918)
 Victim of Society (1919)
 The Prisoner (1920)
 Deceiver of the People (1921)
 The Chain Clinks (1923)
 The Third Watch (1924)
 Gentleman on Time (1924)
 The Heart of Lilian Thorland (1924)
 Lord of the Night (1927)
 Panic (1928)
 The Gypsy Chief (1929)
 Tragedy of Youth (1929)
 The Customs Judge (1929)
 Secret Police (1929)
 Distinguishing Features (1929)
 Witnesses Wanted (1930)
 The Man in the Dark (1930)
 When Women Keep Silent (1937)

References

Bibliography
 Grange, William. Cultural Chronicle of the Weimar Republic. Scarecrow Press, 2008.

External links

1882 births
1944 deaths
German male film actors
German male stage actors
German male silent film actors
20th-century German male actors
Male actors from Gdańsk